Cino Ricci (4 September 1934) is an Italian yachtsman, he was skipper of Azzurra at the 1983 Louis Vuitton Cup and 1987 Louis Vuitton Cup.

Biography
Having abandoned competitive sport, he devoted himself to television and journalistic commentary on the main nautical events, becoming organizer of sailing events. The best known is the Giro d'Italia Sailing, a stage race that takes place annually by circumnavigating the peninsula.

Azzurra
Managed by Luca Cordero di Montezemolo and funded by Aga Khan IV and Gianni Agnelli, Azzurra was formed in 1982. Ambrosini was involved with the construction of the yacht Azzurra (I-4), and they proved to be a competitive new challenge. Skippered by Cino Ricci and with Mauro Pelaschier on the helm, the original Azzurra team won 24 of 49 races at the 1983 Louis Vuitton Cup and developed a large and loyal following in Italy.

See also
 Italy at the America's Cup

References

External links
 Cino Ricci at Vela Italia

1934 births
Living people
Italian male sailors (sport)
Italian sports commentators
Sportspeople from Rimini
America's Cup sailors